Hela Ayari (born 26 August 1994) is a Tunisian judoka. She won her class in the African Judo Championships in 2012, 2014, 2015 and 2016. 

She competed at the 2016 Summer Olympics in Rio de Janeiro, in the women's 52 kg, where she placed ninth.

References

External links
 
 
 

1994 births
Living people
Tunisian female judoka
Olympic judoka of Tunisia
Judoka at the 2016 Summer Olympics
African Games silver medalists for Tunisia
African Games medalists in judo
Mediterranean Games bronze medalists for Tunisia
Mediterranean Games medalists in judo
Competitors at the 2015 African Games
Competitors at the 2013 Mediterranean Games
20th-century Tunisian women
21st-century Tunisian women